Camastra is a comune (municipality) in the Province of Agrigento in the Italian region Sicily, located about  southeast of Palermo and about  southeast of Agrigento.

Camastra borders the following municipalities: Licata, Naro, Palma di Montechiaro.

The municipality contains the ruins of the Castellazzo di Camastra.

Demographic evolution

References 

Cities and towns in Sicily